Caroline Bird (born 1986) is a British poet, playwright and author.

Life
Caroline Bird was born in 1986. Daughter of Jude Kelly, she grew up in Leeds, England, and attended the Steiner School in York and the Lady Eleanor Holles School before moving to London in 2001. She studied English literature at Oxford University and was president of the Oxford Poetry Society. She teaches regularly at the Arvon Foundation.

Published works
Bird has published six collections of poetry. Her sixth collection The Air Year won the Forward Prize for Best Collection 2020, and was shortlisted for the Costa Prize and the Polar Prize. Her fifth collection, In These Days Of Prohibition, was shortlisted for the 2017 TS Eliot Prize and The Ted Hughes Award. Her first collection, Looking Through Letterboxes (published in 2002 when she was 15), is a collection of poems built on the traditions of fairy tales, fantasy and romance. Her second collection, Trouble Came to the Turnip, was published in September 2006 to critical acclaim. Her third collection, Watering Can,' received a Poetry Book Society Recommendation. Her fourth collection, The Hat-Stand Union, published in 2013, was described by Simon Armitage as "spring-loaded, sad, deadly... explodes with poetry." Her Selected Poems, Rookie was published in May 2022.

Bird's poems have been published in several anthologies and journals including Poetry Magazine, PN Review, Poetry Review and The North magazine. Her poems and a commissioned short story, "Sucking Eggs", have been broadcast on BBC Radio 4. 

A member of the Royal Court Young Writers Programme, Bird is also a playwright. She was part of the Bush Theatre's 2011 project Sixty-Six Books, for which she wrote a piece based on a book of the King James Bible. In February 2012, she presented her Beano-inspired show The Trial of Dennis the Menace, featuring original music by Matt Rogers, which was performed in the Purcell Room at Southbank Centre. In Autumn 2012, her radical version of The Trojan Women enjoyed a seven-week run at The Gate Theatre, to wide critical acclaim. Her original play Chamber Piece was performed at the Lyric Hammersmith as part of their Secret Theatre Season. 

In Christmas 2015, her re-twisted telling of The Wonderful Wizard of Oz premiered at Northern Stage, and received a four-star review in The Times. In Spring 2022, her play Red Ellen about the life and work of Ellen Wilkinson, was produced by Northern Stage, Nottingham Playhouse and Royal Lyceum Theatre and received four star reviews in The Guardian, The Times, WhatsOnStage and The Stage.

Prizes and recognition
Bird was awarded the Forward Prize for Best Collection in 2020 for The Air Year. She was shortlisted for the Costa Prize and the Polari Prize in 2022 and the T. S. Eliot Prize and the Ted Hughes Award in 2017.

She was a winner of the Poetry London Competition in 2007, the Peterloo Poetry Competition for three years running (2004, 2003 and 2002), a major Eric Gregory Award in 2002 and the Foyle Young Poet of the Year Award in 1999 and 2000. She was shortlisted for the Geoffrey Dearmer Award in 2001. Caroline was shortlisted for the Dylan Thomas Prize in 2008, and was the youngest writer on the list at 21. She was shortlisted again for the Dylan Thomas Prize 2010. She was awarded the honour of "Young Champion" in 2010 at the inaugural Youth Olympic Games in Singapore and attended the "What Makes A Young Champion?" event.

She was on the shortlist for Shell Woman Of The Future Awards 2011.

She was one of the five official poets for the London Olympics 2012. Her poem ‘"The Fun Palace", which celebrates the life and work of Joan Littlewood, is now erected on the Olympic Site outside the main stadium.

Her original play Chamber Piece was shortlisted for The Susan Smith Blackburn Prize 2014.

Bibliography
 Looking Through Letterboxes, Carcanet Press (2002)
 Trouble Came to the Turnip, Carcanet Press (2006)
 Watering Can, Carcanet Press (2009)
 The Trojan Women, Oberon Books (2012)
 The Hat-Stand Union, Carcanet Press (2013)
 Chamber Piece, Oberon Books (2013)
 The Wonderful Wizard of Oz, Oberon Books (2015)
 In These Days of Prohibition, Carcanet Press (2017)
 The Air Year, Carcanet Press (2020)
 Red Ellen, Nick Hern (2022)
 Rookie, Selected Poems, Carcanet Press (2022)

References

External links
Caroline Bird
Feature on Bird's shortlisting for The Dylan Thomas Prize in The Guardian
Feature on Bird's shortlisting for The Dylan Thomas Prize on the BBC website

1986 births
21st-century British dramatists and playwrights
21st-century English poets
21st-century English women writers
English dramatists and playwrights
English women dramatists and playwrights
English women poets
Living people
People educated at Lady Eleanor Holles School